The 2010 FIBA Europe Under-20 Championship for Women was the 9th edition of the FIBA Europe Under-20 Championship for Women. 16 teams featured the competition, held in Liepāja and Grobiņa, in Latvia, from July 15–25. France was the current title holder. Russia won the title against Spain.

Participating teams

  (Winners, 2009 FIBA Europe Under-20 Championship for Women Division B)

  (Runners-up, 2009 FIBA Europe Under-20 Championship for Women Division B)

Group stages

Preliminary round
In this round, the sixteen teams were allocated in four groups of four teams each. The top three will qualify for the qualifying round. The last team of each group will play for the 13th–16th place in the Classification Games.

Times given below are in CEST (UTC+2).

Group A

Group B

Group C

Group D

Qualifying round
The twelve teams remaining will be allocated in two groups of six teams each. The four top teams will advance to the quarterfinals. The last two teams of each group will play for the 9th–12th place.

Group E

{{Basketballbox|bg=
|date=July 20
|place=Grobiņa Sport Hall, Grobiņa 
|time=18:00
|teamA=
|scoreA=86
|teamB=
|scoreB=73
|Q1=31–20
|Q2=11–25
|Q3=20–14
|Q4=24–13
|report=Report
|points1=Malashenko 24
|rebounds1=Malashenko 11
|assist1=Iagupova 8
|points2=van den Adel 24
|rebounds2=van den Adel 8
|assist2=Kuijt, van den Adel 4
|referee=Martynas Gudas, Jaroslav Janac, Miroslav Tomov
}}

Group F

Classification round
The last team of each group in the preliminary round will compete in this Classification Round. The four teams will play in one group. The last two teams will be relegated to Division B for the next championship.

Group G

Knockout round

Championship

Quarterfinals

Semifinals

Bronze medal game

Final

5th–8th playoffs

5th–8th semifinals

7th place playoff

5th place playoff

9th–12th playoffs

9th–12th semifinals

11th place playoff

9th place playoff

Final standings

Statistical leadersPointsReboundsAssistsBlocksSteals'''

External links
Official Site

2010
2010–11 in European women's basketball
2010–11 in Latvian basketball
International women's basketball competitions hosted by Latvia
International youth basketball competitions hosted by Latvia
2010 in youth sport